Quentin Omario Moses (November 18, 1983 – February 12, 2017) was an American football outside linebacker and coach. He was drafted by the Oakland Raiders in the 3rd round of the 2007 NFL Draft. After his playing career ended, he became the defensive ends coach for Reinhardt University.

Early years
Moses attended Cedar Shoals High School in Athens, Georgia. He was a prepStar All-Southeast Region, Atlanta Journal-Constitution Top 50 in Georgia, and named to Athens Banner-Herald All-Northeast Georgia team senior season as a defensive end. He was highly recruited as a basketball player before his decision to focus solely on football.

College career

Awards and honors
 First-team Sporting News All-Freshman (2003)
 2x SEC Academic Honor Roll (2004–2005)
 Mid-season Sports Illustrated All-American (2005)
 Consensus First-team All-SEC (2005)
 Rivals.com All-American (2005)
 Second-team Walter Camp Football Foundation All-American (2006)
 Third-team Associated Press All-American (2006)
 Playboy All-American (2006)

Statistics

Key: GP - games played; Total - total tackles; Solo - solo tackles; Ast - assisted tackles; TFL - tackles for loss; Sck - quarterback sacks; FF - forced fumbles; FR - fumble recoveries; INT - interceptions; PD - passes defensed; TD - touchdowns

Professional career

Pre-draft

Oakland Raiders
Drafted by the Oakland Raiders with the first pick in the third round and was cut on September 1. Moses was the highest drafted player from that year's draft not to make a roster on opening day.

Arizona Cardinals
Moses was claimed off waivers by the Arizona Cardinals on September 2, 2007. He was released on October 16, 2007.

Miami Dolphins
Moses was signed by the Miami Dolphins on October 23, 2007. He recorded his first career full sack on November 26, bringing down Ben Roethlisberger during a Monday Night Football game against the Pittsburgh Steelers.

An exclusive-rights free agent in the 2009 offseason, Moses was re-signed on March 31, 2009, to a one-year, $460,000 contract with the Dolphins.

Death
On February 12, 2017, Moses died battling a house fire in Monroe, Georgia, where he tried to save his best friend Xavier Godard's wife Andria Godard and their daughter Jasmin Godard; Moses was later taken to a hospital where he later died. He was 33.

References

External links
Arizona Cardinals bio
Georgia Bulldog bio
Miami Dolphins bio
Oakland Raiders bio
Just Sports Stats

1983 births
2017 deaths
Sportspeople from Athens, Georgia
Players of American football from Georgia (U.S. state)
American football defensive ends
American football outside linebackers
Georgia Bulldogs football players
Oakland Raiders players
Arizona Cardinals players
Miami Dolphins players
Virginia Destroyers players
Accidental deaths in Georgia (U.S. state)
Deaths from fire in the United States